Feminist theory as it relates to architecture has forged the way for the rediscovery of such female architects as Eileen Gray. These women imagined an architecture that challenged the way the traditional family would live. They practiced architecture with what they considered feminist theories or approaches. The rediscovery of architecture through feminist theory is not limited to female architects. Architects like Le Corbusier and Adolf Loos have also had their architecture reexamined through feminist theory.

The architecture
In Dolores Hayden's book The Grand Domestic Revolution she explains the ways in which "a lost feminine tradition" led to a "redefining of house work and the housing needs of women and their families, push[ing] architects and urban planners to reconsider the effects of design on family life". This idea of the changing needs of the family can be seen in the houses of Truus Schröder, Eileen Gray and LeCorbusier's Villa Stein de-Monzie. The Rietveld Schröder House is an excellent example of the way that the "modern" lives of the family demanded a new architecture.

"The Schröder House was not only a creative work of artistic design but offered its users a new environment in which to redefine family life, women's rights and the responsibilities of individuals and to each other"

The movable walls and partitions give a sense of consciousness and an overall feeling that the architecture was built with a greater purpose. The fact that Truus Schröder's beliefs in the family and as the house playing a part in the family; the house almost as a member. Truus Schröder is closely related to Dutch and European feminism of the twentieth century, based on her goals for her house.

Eileen Gray's E-1027 is another example of feminist theory being applied to architecture.

Much like Schröder, Gray designed an architecture that would address the needs of the occupants and the new family unit. Gray worked within the model of modern architecture, LeCorbusier's "5 points of new architecture" for example as well as addressing the issues of the building or home as an experience.

Like E1027 and The Schroder House, Villa Stein de Monzie was rediscovered through feminist theory. More well known is the way in which this house called gender relations and the way in which the relationship between men and women was negotiated in a new way.

This house is of particular importance in feminist theory because it called into question the typical domestic group and gender relations. This domestic group that included a married couple and a woman with her child called domestic space into question.

See also
Women in architecture

References

Further reading

Feminism and the arts
Architectural theory